Hans Hauck (1920–2003) was an Afro-German who served in the Wehrmacht during the Nazi regime in Germany.

Hans was born in Frankfurt in 1920. He was the son of an Algerian soldier of black descent serving in the French Army. An SS officer helped get him work on the railway. During 1935 or 1936 Hauck was sterilised under the Nazi racial purity measures.

In 1939 he was declared "unworthy" to join the Army when he went through the conscription process. Following a suicide attempt in 1941, Hauck joined the Wehrmacht the following year. He attributed his survival of the Nazi regime to his service in the Army. He made "Private first Class" within five months. Hauck was wounded five times, and captured by the Red Army in 1945 and released in 1949.

See also
Rhineland Bastards, the children of French colonial troops and German women.

References

 Other Germans: Black Germans and the Politics of Race, Gender and memory in the Third Reich by Tina Campt, University of Michigan Press, 2005

1920 births
2003 deaths
German Army personnel of World War II
German people of Algerian descent
People from Frankfurt